Wattenberg is a surname. Notable people with the surname include: 

 Ben Wattenberg (1933–2015), American conservative author
 Bill Wattenburg (born 1936), American inventor and talk show host
 Daniel Wattenberg (born 1959), American journalist and musician, son of Ben
 Frida Wattenberg (1924–2020), member of the French Resistance
 Gregg Wattenberg, American musician
 Laura Wattenberg, American name expert
 Luke Wattenberg (born 1997), American football player
 Martin M. Wattenberg (born 1970), software developer and artist
 Martin Wattenberg (political scientist), American political scientist